Nulvi is a comune (municipality) in the Province of Sassari in the Italian region Sardinia, located about  north of Cagliari and about  northeast of Sassari.  It is one of the main centers of the Anglona historical regione. 
 
Nulvi borders the following municipalities: Chiaramonti, Laerru, Martis, Osilo, Ploaghe, Sedini, Tergu.

References

Cities and towns in Sardinia